Upattinas School and Resource Center was a private, non-profit school that served students in kindergarten through twelfth grade, as well as a homeschool resource center.  Located in Glenmoore, Pennsylvania, Upattinas was a Democratic school where everyone—staff, students, parents, and board—had the opportunity to participate in school governance.

Upattinas Open Community Corporation was licensed by the Commonwealth of Pennsylvania as a Private Academic School, authorized by the Department of Immigration to grant I-20 status to non-immigrant students from other countries, and recognized by the Commonwealth of Pennsylvania to issue a Home Education Diploma.

History

Upattinas was founded in 1971 by a group of families who believed that learning is life and that the freedom to participate in decision making is an important dimension of school. These twenty-one families made a commitment to develop a family cooperative school that would reflect such principles. At the time, a parent, Jasper Brinton, wrote these words:

"We want a school. We want an atmosphere. We believe in our children, even if we are unsure of ourselves. We want a feeling that we can live in a natural way, we want to commit ourselves to a real involved community to flourish. Our school will be an idea, not a place; a fertile playground, not a building: an organic stage. First, we want to trust our children. We want them to be self sufficient, happy with themselves, weak and strong; sensitive to the larger world. Honest. We will give our children the chance to become, we will do everything we can to try to understand them. Live with them. Ours will be a community school."

These founding families were invited to use part of Tina French-Miller's home, and meeting "up at Tina's" gave the school its name. Over time a high school program was added and new staff was hired. The school moved to the top of Valley Forge Mountain, and developed an integrated, open program. Academic studies were integrated into all kinds of activities and the arts were part of everyday life. By 1978 the school had outgrown its space and the community decided to purchase its final site in Glenmoore, Pennsylvania.

In 1983 Upattinas became active in the National Coalition of Alternative Community Schools (NCACS) and attended and hosted National Conferences thereafter. A resource center for home education was created in 1986. An international program became a reality shortly thereafter. In 1991 a sister school in Japan, the Nomugi Open Community School, was founded.

Upattinas closed at the end of the 2013-14 academic year.

Overview

The Upattinas mission was "to nurture and inspire interest-driven, noncoercive learning in an open democratic community."

The staff, students, and parents believed:
 That education should be rigorous, all-encompassing, but not rigid.
 That an environment conducive to thought is most important environment.
 That freedom of thought and expression is vital.
 In diversity and nondiscrimination.
 In reading deeply and discussing the works that shaped our world.
 That we must work for environmental renewal and global justice.

All students at Upattinas were invited to participate in the democratic governance of the school. Students were expected to attend the weekly All-School Meeting, and participation in various social and work committees was encouraged.

References

External links
 
 Upattinas blog
 GreatSchools - Upattinas
 Private Schools Report - Upattinas
 School Digger - Upattinas
 Private School Review - Upattinas School
 I WANT TO DO THIS ALL DAY - Redefining Learning & Reinventing Education - An Audio Documentary

Homeschooling in the United States
Educational institutions established in 1971
Private high schools in Pennsylvania
Schools in Chester County, Pennsylvania
Private middle schools in Pennsylvania
Private elementary schools in Pennsylvania
1971 establishments in Pennsylvania